Club Deportivo Aurrerá Ondarroa (Ondarroako Aurrera Kirol Elkartea in Basque) is a Spanish football team based in Ondarroa, in the autonomous community of Basque Country. Founded in 1921, it plays in Tercera División RFEF – Group 4, holding home matches at Zaldupe.

Development fee
In February 2018, the club received a €600,000 windfall resulting from the transfer of their former youth player Iñigo Martínez who moved between the region's biggest clubs Real Sociedad and Athletic Bilbao. Although less than 10% of the €32 million fee (the standard youth development payment percentage) due to a prior agreement between Aurrerá and Real in the event of a big move involving the player, it represented three times their annual budget and allowed for significant improvements to be made to facilities.

Season to season

32 seasons in Tercera División
1 season in Tercera División RFEF

References

External links
La Preferente team profile 
ArefePedia profile 
Soccerway team profile

Football clubs in the Basque Country (autonomous community)
Association football clubs established in 1921
1921 establishments in Spain